The Army–Notre Dame football rivalry is an American college football rivalry between the Army Black Knights football team of the United States Military Academy and Notre Dame Fighting Irish football team of the University of Notre Dame. The rivalry dates back to 1913, when both teams were among the top college football programs in the United States.

Series history

The first Army–Notre Dame game in 1913 is generally regarded as the game that established the national reputation of the Fighting Irish. In that game, Notre Dame revolutionized the forward pass in a stunning 35–13 victory. For years it was "The Game" on Notre Dame's schedule, played at Yankee Stadium in New York. During the 1940s, the rivalry with the Army Cadets reached its zenith. This was because both teams were extremely successful and met several times in key games (including one of the Games of the Century, a scoreless tie in  1946). In 1944, the Cadets administered the worst defeat in Notre Dame football history, crushing the Fighting Irish 59–0. The following year, it was more of the same, a 48–0 blitzkrieg. After meeting every year since 1919, the series went on a ten-year hiatus starting in 1947 and lasting until 1957. The game was played in South Bend for the first time and the Fighting Irish won 27–7.

Like Navy, due to the small capacity of Army's Michie Stadium, the Cadets played their home games at a neutral site, which for a number of years was Yankee Stadium and before that, the Polo Grounds. In 1957, the game was played in Philadelphia's Municipal (later John F. Kennedy Memorial) Stadium while in 1965, the teams met at the year-old Shea Stadium in Queens. They last met at the original Yankee Stadium in 1969; it was played at West Point in 1973, and the Fighting Irish rolled 62–3 on their way to the national championship. In more recent times, games in which Army was the host have been played at Giants Stadium in East Rutherford, New Jersey. Notre Dame leads the series .  Their latest matchup came in 2016, when the teams met for the 2016 Shamrock series in the Alamodome in San Antonio; Notre Dame won easily,  and the Irish have won the last fifteen, the longest streak in the rivalry's history.

The 1944 game
It had been thirteen years since Army had beaten Notre Dame. In fact, the last time Army had scored against the Irish was in 1938. The Irish were the defending national champions, but lost many key players to graduation and the armed services. The Irish even lost head coach Frank Leahy to military service, and were now being led by Ed McKeever.

Notre Dame went into the game 5–1 and ranked 5, coming off a 32–13 loss to Navy. The Army squad was being led by Glenn Davis and Doc Blanchard. The Cadets also had a quarterback named Doug Kenna, and a transfer from the University of Texas, sprinter Max Minor.

Army overwhelmed the Irish. Kenna opened the scoring with a run for touchdown. He wasn't done, as he played defense as well, intercepting an Irish pass, which led to a scoring run by Minor. Kenna then pulled a trifecta of sorts, when he passed for a third score. Davis, a late scratch as a starter, also intercepted a pass, and had two offensive runs for scores. By halftime, Army had a commanding 33–0 lead.

Kenna added another scoring pass, and Davis another run for a score. Even Army's back-ups got into the act. Harold Tavzel, a second string tackle, intercepted a poorly thrown pass from the Irish quarterback, and jogged a few yards for a score. When the game was over, Army won 59–0, handing the Irish the worst loss in the program's history. The Irish would recover, winning their last three games to finish 8–2 and ranked 9 in the nation.

When asked by a reporter about the score, Army halfback Doc Blanchard said "If there was anyone to blame for the size of the margin, it was Notre Dame, which fired our desire to win with its long humiliation of Army teams."

Game results

Venues
 The Plain, West Point, NY: 1913–1922 (10 times)
 Ebbets Field, Brooklyn, NY: 1923 (once)
 Polo Grounds, New York, NY: 1924 (once)
 Yankee Stadium (1923), Bronx, NY: 1925-29, 1931–1946, 1969 (22 times)
 Soldier Field, Chicago, IL: 1930 (once)
 Notre Dame Stadium, South Bend, IN: 1947, 1958, 1966, 1970, 1974, 1980, 1985, 1998, 2006 (9 times)
 Philadelphia Municipal Stadium, 1957 (once)
 Shea Stadium, Queens, NY: 1965 (once)
 Michie Stadium, West Point, NY: 1973 (once)
 Giants Stadium, East Rutherford, NJ: 1977, 1983, 1995 (thrice)
 Yankee Stadium (current), Bronx, NY: 2010
 Alamodome, San Antonio, TX: 2016

See also  
 List of NCAA college football rivalry games

References

College football rivalries in the United States
Army Black Knights football
Notre Dame Fighting Irish football